Karan (also Romanized as Karān and Karrān) is a village in Binalud Rural District, in the Central District of Nishapur County, Razavi Khorasan Province, Iran. At the 2006 census, its population was 278, in 68 families.

References 

Populated places in Nishapur County